Youssef Mokhtari (born 5 March 1979) is a Moroccan former professional footballer who played as a midfielder.

Career
Mokhtari had previous spells at SSV Jahn Regensburg, Wacker Burghausen, Energie Cottbus, 1. FC Köln, MSV Duisburg, Al-Rayyan and FC Metz. On 14 October 2008, he moved to German 2. Bundesliga team FSV Frankfurt and left after just one year later to sign with SpVgg Greuther Fürth. On 27 January 2010, Mokhtari left Fürth, dissolving his contract by mutual consent. After being released by Greuther Fürth, Mokhtari signed later on the same day a contract running half a year with FC Metz. On 20 June 2014, he agreed to a two-year deal with Luxembourg champion F91 Dudelange after spending three years playing for German 3. Liga side SV Wacker Burghausen.

Personal life
He is the brother of Oualid Mokhtari who played for FSV Frankfurt among other clubs.

Career statistics

International
Scores and results list Morocco's goal tally first, score column indicates score after each Mokhtari goal.

References

External links
 

Living people
1979 births
People from Nador
Association football midfielders
Moroccan footballers
Morocco international footballers
2004 African Cup of Nations players
2008 Africa Cup of Nations players
Ligue 2 players
Bundesliga players
2. Bundesliga players
3. Liga players
Luxembourg National Division players
Qatar Stars League players
SSV Jahn Regensburg players
SV Wacker Burghausen players
FC Energie Cottbus players
1. FC Köln players
MSV Duisburg players
FSV Frankfurt players
SpVgg Greuther Fürth players
Al-Rayyan SC players
FC Metz players
F91 Dudelange players
SC Hessen Dreieich players
Riffian people
Berber Moroccans
Moroccan expatriate footballers
Moroccan expatriate sportspeople in Germany
Expatriate footballers in Germany
Moroccan expatriate sportspeople in Qatar
Expatriate footballers in Qatar
Moroccan expatriate sportspeople in France
Expatriate footballers in France
Moroccan expatriate sportspeople in Luxembourg
Expatriate footballers in Luxembourg